Killjoy DeSade (born Frank Pucci; November 4, 1966 – March 18, 2018) was an American musician, best known as the lead vocalist for the death metal band Necrophagia.

Career 
Pucci founded Necrophagia in 1983, which first dissolved in 1990. Shortly after Necrophagia's dissolution, he formed his solo band and released Compelled by Fear in 1990. Pucci reformed Necrophagia in 1997 with Phil Anselmo, and performed with the band until his demise. Pucci was the only original member in the group's current lineup.

He was the vocalist for the death metal/thrash metal band Cabal in 1990. Pucci participated in several side projects with Phil Anselmo, including Viking Crown and Eibon. He was the vocalist for the death metal band The Ravenous, which included Nuclear Assault bassist Dan Lilker and Death drummer Chris Reifert. Pucci also sang for the black metal band Wurdulak, Forlis and Enoch. He appears in the film August Underground's Mordum, released on video in 2003. and the film Opening The Mind, released in 2019

On March 18, 2018, the band announced via their Facebook page that Killjoy had died:

Personal life 
Pucci was born in East Liverpool, Ohio, the son of the late Frank Pucci and Constance (Crabtree) Keller-Orr. He had two sons and one daughter. Pucci died on March 18, 2018, in a local hospital in East Liverpool.

Discography

Necrophagia

Viking Crown

The Ravenous

Killjoy

Wurdulak

Enoch

References 

1966 births
2018 deaths
Death metal musicians
Musicians from Cleveland
People from East Liverpool, Ohio